Megarhyssa greenei, also known as Greene's giant ichneumonid wasp, is a species of large ichneumon wasp. It is known from the United States and Canada.

Description and identification 
It is very similar in appearance to Megarhyssa macrurus, but the latter species has a relatively longer ovipositor (about 2x the total body length, where greenei is only slightly greater than 1x), and usually has more extensive dark wing markings. M. greenei also lacks the dark striping on the face present on M. macrurus.

Ecology 
M. greenei is a parasitoid wasp, and its host is Tremex columba, a sawfly.

References

External links
Photos on BugGuide.net

Ichneumonidae
Insects described in 1911